Many materials have a well-characterized refractive index, but these indexes often depend strongly upon the frequency of light, causing optical dispersion. Standard refractive index measurements are taken at the "yellow doublet" sodium D line, with a wavelength (λ) of 589 nanometers.

There are also weaker dependencies on temperature, pressure/stress, etc., as well on precise material compositions (presence of dopants, etc.); for many materials and typical conditions, however, these variations are at the percent level or less. Thus, it is especially important to cite the source for an index measurement if precision is required.

In general, an index of refraction is a complex number with both a real and imaginary part, where the latter indicates the strength of absorption loss at a particular wavelength—thus, the imaginary part is sometimes called the extinction coefficient . Such losses become particularly significant, for example, in metals at short (e.g. visible) wavelengths, and must be included in any description of the refractive index.

List

See also
Sellmeier equation
Corrective lens#Ophthalmic material property tables
Optical properties of water and ice

References

External links 
International Association for the Properties of Water and Steam
Ioffe institute, Russian Federation 
Crystran, United Kingdom
Jena University, Germany
Hyperphysics list of refractive indices
Luxpop: Index of refraction values and photonics calculations
Kaye and Laby Online Provided by the National Physical Laboratory, UK
List of Refractive Indices of Solvents

Physics-related lists
Optics